Big Ones You Can Look At is a VHS and Laserdisc featuring music videos by the American band Aerosmith. It was released on November 1, 1994. In addition, there are outtakes and band interviews. Running time is 100 minutes. The suggestive title comes from – and is a companion to – the 1994 compilation album Big Ones.

A DVD release (out of print, unknown if official or not) was released in Brazil with Dolby Digital 2.0 Stereo and 5.1 Surround sound tracks and quality better than the VHS and Laserdisc releases.

Some scenes from the Pump era were culled from the band's previous video compilation The Making of Pump. Along with the band members, various individuals make cameo appearances during the outtakes and making-of segments, including Marty Callner, John Kalodner, and Hank Azaria. The behind the scenes segment for "Eat the Rich" includes the band's collaboration with Melvin Liufau, Wesey Mamea, Liainaiala Tagaloa, Mapuhi T. Tekurio, and Aladd Alationa Teofilo, playing the log drums.

Among the notable actors appearing in the videos include: Alicia Silverstone, Liv Tyler, Edward Furlong, Stephen Dorff, Josh Holloway, Jason London, Brandi Brandt, Kristin Dattilo, Lesley Ann Warren, and Nicholas Guest.

Track listing 
Opening/meet the band
Official video: "Deuces Are Wild"
The making of the "Livin' on the Edge" video
Official video: "Livin' on the Edge"
Behind the scenes during the recording of "Eat the Rich"
Official video: Eat the Rich"
The making of the "Cryin'" video
Official video: "Cryin'"
The making of the "Amazing" video
Official video: "Amazing"
The making of the "Crazy" video
Official video: "Crazy" (Director's cut)
Behind the scenes during the recording of "Love in an Elevator"
Official video: "Love in an Elevator"
Behind the scenes during the recording of "Janie's Got a Gun"
Official video: "Water Song/Janie's Got a Gun"
Official studio video: "What It Takes (The Recording Of)"
Outtakes - On tour
Official video: "Dulcimer Stomp/The Other Side"
Outtakes - Photo session
Official video: "Dude (Looks Like a Lady)"
Behind the scenes at the recording of The Simpsons ("Flaming Moe's" episode)
Official video: "Angel"
Outtakes - Men of the world
Official video: "Rag Doll" (Video)
Outtakes/End credits

Certifications

Works cited
Big Ones You Can Look At - VHS, 1994
Discogs - Big Ones You Can Look At

References

Aerosmith video albums
1994 video albums
Music video compilation albums
1994 compilation albums
Aerosmith compilation albums
Geffen Records video albums